Hana Vučko  (born 14 November 1998) is a retired Slovenian handball player.

She was selected to represent the Slovenian national team at the 2017 World Women's Handball Championship.

References

External links

1998 births
Living people
Handball players from Ljubljana
Slovenian female handball players